Glaucopsyche piasus, the arrowhead blue, is a western North American butterfly of the family Lycaenidae. It is a locally common butterfly that favors prairie, open woodland, and woodland edges and trails.

Larvae feed on lupine (Lupinus) and milkvetch (Astragalus) species.

References

External links
Arrowhead Blue, Canadian Biodiversity Information Facility

piasus
Butterflies described in 1852
Butterflies of North America